Beysim Beysim (born 4 August 1993) is a Bulgarian footballer who plays as a defender for Botev Galabovo.

Career
Beysim played in the Second League for Galabovo for two seasons before being released in June 2017. In July 2017, he joined Arda Kardzhali.  He left the club at the end of the season.  In July 2018, Beysim returned to Botev Galabovo.

References

External links

Profile at Sportal

1993 births
Living people
People from Haskovo
Bulgarian footballers
Association football defenders
First Professional Football League (Bulgaria) players
Second Professional Football League (Bulgaria) players
FC Haskovo players
FC Botev Galabovo players
FC Arda Kardzhali players
Bulgarian people of Turkish descent
Sportspeople from Haskovo Province